Central Huron is a township in western Ontario, Canada, in Huron County. It is situated on Lake Huron between the Maitland River and the Bayfield River.

History
The Municipality of Central Huron was formed on January 1, 2001, when the Town of Clinton, the Township of Hullett and the Township of Goderich were amalgamated.

Communities
The township of Central Huron comprises a number of villages and hamlets, including the following communities:

 Cornwall Township: Blue Water Beach, Clinton (west portion), Holmesville, Porter's Hill, Summerhill (west portion)
 Hullett Township: Auburn, Blyth, Clinton (east portion), Harlock, Kinburn, Londesborough, Summerhill (east portion)

Demographics 

See also
 List of townships in Ontario

References

External links

Lower-tier municipalities in Ontario
Municipalities in Huron County, Ontario